André Boyer is a French-Canadian poker player from Acton Vale, Quebec, Canada, who has won a World Series of Poker bracelet.

Boyer first cashed in the World Series of Poker in 1996, and also made the $10,000 No Limit Hold'em Main Event final table that year.  He finished in 6th place, winning $97,500 in that tournament which was won by Huck Seed.  He also cashed in the 2007 main event, earning $29,883 for his 434th-place finish.

Boyer won his WSOP bracelet in 2005 in the $3,000 No Limit Hold'em event, earning $682,810 in addition to the title.  He defeated a final table that included John Duthie and Matthew Glantz, whom Boyer defeated heads-up to win the title.

Boyer has made numerous other final tables at the WSOP, most recently finishing in 222nd place in the 2009 40th Annual World Series of Poker.

As of 2015, Boyer's total tournament winnings exceed $1,500,000.

He lived in Las Vegas for 18 years in the 1980s, 1990s and 2000s but has since moved back to his native Quebec where he was the colour commentator for the World Series of Poker French-Canadian broadcasts on RDS between 2003 and 2008. He was instrumental in the establishment of the Canadian National Poker Tournament League and Ligue de tournois de poker du Québec.

References

Canadian poker players
World Series of Poker bracelet winners
Poker commentators
Living people
Year of birth missing (living people)